In mathematics, characteristic power series may refer to:

 Multiplicative sequence
 Iwasawa algebra